The Benkersandstein (German for Benker Sandstone) is a geologic formation in Germany. It preserves fossils dating back to the Late Triassic (Carnian) period. Fossil theropod tracks have been reported from the formation.

Fossil content 
 Temnospondyls
 Capitosaurus arenaceus
 Ichnofossils
 Chirotherium storetonense
 Coelurosaurichnus schlehenbergensis

See also 
 List of fossiliferous stratigraphic units in Germany
 List of dinosaur-bearing rock formations
 List of stratigraphic units with theropod tracks
 Ansbachersandstein, contemporaneous ichnofossiliferous formation of Bavaria
 Chañares Formation, fossiliferous formation of the Ischigualasto-Villa Unión Basin, Argentina
 Candelária Formation, contemporaneous fossiliferous formation of the Paraná Basin, Brazil
 Molteno Formation, contemporaneous fossiliferous formation of Lesotho and South Africa
 Pebbly Arkose Formation, contemporaneous fossiliferous formation of Botswana, Zambia and Zimbabwe
 Denmark Hill Insect Bed, contemporaneous fossiliferous unit of Queensland, Australia
 Madygen Formation, contemporaneous Lagerstätte of Kyrgyzstan

References

Bibliography

Further reading 
 K. Rehnelt. 1959. Neue Reptilienfährten-Funde aus der germanischen Trias [New reptile footprint discoveries in the German Trias]. Jahrbuch des Staatlichen Museum für Mineralogie und Geologie zu Dresden 1959:97-103
 K. Rehnelt. 1950. Beitrag über Fährtenspuren im unteren Gipskeuper von Bayreuth [Contribution on the trackways from the lower Gipskeuper of Bayreuth]. Naturwissenschaftliche Gesellschaft Bayreuth, Abhandlungen 1950:27-36
 G. Münster. 1836. Communications addressed to Professor Bronn. Neues Jahrbuch für Mineralogie, Geognosie, Geologie und Petrefaktenkunde 1836:580-581

Geologic formations of Germany
Triassic System of Europe
Carnian Stage
Triassic Germany
Sandstone formations
Ichnofossiliferous formations
Paleontology in Germany